Anthony Forest may refer to:

Bishop Anthony Forest, namesake of Bishop Forest High School
Anthony Forest (rugby); see CS Bourgoin-Jallieu

See also
Anthony Forrest (disambiguation)